Rechingeriella is a genus of fungi in the family Zopfiaceae; according to the 2007 Outline of Ascomycota, the placement in this family is uncertain.

The genus name of Rechingeriella is in honour of Professor Karl Heinz Rechinger Hon FRSE (1906–1998), who was an Austrian botanist and phytogeographer. 

The genus was circumscribed by Franz Petrak in Ann. Naturhist. Mus. Wien vol.50 on pages 410, 465 and 467 in 1939.

Species;
 Rechingeriella boudieri 
 Rechingeriella insignis 
 Rechingeriella verrucosa 

Former species;
 R. bispora  now Copromyces bisporus in Sordariomycetidae family 
 R. eutypoides  now Monosporascus eutypoides in Diatrypaceae family

References

External links

Pleosporales